The 2008–09 Scottish Football League Third Division (also known as the 2008–09 Irn-Bru Scottish Football League Third Division for sponsorship reasons) was the 14th season in the format of ten teams in the fourth-tier of Scottish football. The season started on 2 August 2008 and ended on 9 May 2009. Dumbarton F.C. finished top and were promoted alongside Stenhousemuir F.C. as play-off winners.
Cowdenbeath F.C. were also promoted due to Livingston being demoted to the Third Division.

Teams for 2008–09

East Fife as champions of the 2007–08 season were directly promoted to the 2008–09 Scottish Second Division. They were replaced by Berwick Rangers who finished bottom of the 2007–08 Scottish Second Division.

A second promotion place was available via a play-off tournament between the ninth-placed team of the 2007–08 Scottish Second Division, Cowdenbeath, and the sides ranked second, third and fourth in the 2007–08 Scottish Third Division, Stranraer, Montrose and Arbroath respectively. The play off was won by Arbroath who defeated Stranraer in the final. Cowdenbeath were therefore relegated. However, due to Gretna's expulsion from the Football League, an extra promotion place was awarded, thus Stranraer as losing play-off finalists were also promoted.

Annan Athletic, formerly of the East of Scotland League, were admitted to the SFL to replace Gretna, who resigned their league status on 3 June.) The SFL voted on the matter on 3 July, with 5 clubs having put forward applications. Annan, who like Gretna are from the Dumfries and Galloway region, were chosen above other applicants Cove Rangers, Edinburgh City, Preston Athletic and Spartans.

Overview
Relegated from Second Division to Third Division
 Berwick Rangers
 Cowdenbeath (via play-offs)

Promoted from Third Division to Second Division
 East Fife
 Arbroath (via play-offs)
 Stranraer (losing play-off finalists, promoted due to Gretna's demotion to Third Division)

Newly admitted into SFL
 Annan Athletic

Stadia and attendances

Source: The League Insider
A.East Stirlingshire ground shared with Stenhousemuir.

Managerial changes

League table

Results
Teams play each other four times in this league. In the first half of the season each team plays every other team twice (home and away) and then do the same in the second half of the season.

First half of season

Second half of season

Top scorers

Source: The League Insider

Events

 3 July – Annan Athletic, formerly of the East of Scotland League were admitted to the SFL, beating Cove Rangers, Edinburgh City, Preston Athletic and Spartans. They replaced Gretna, who resigned their league status on 3 June.
 13 November – A consortium led by Berwick Rangers Supporters Club agreed a deal to take over the club. Following a poor run of form, manager Allan McGonigal resigned at the same time saying "I made up my mind that when the current directors left I would move on."

Monthly awards

References

Scottish Third Division seasons
3
4
Scot